Roy Clay Sr. (born 1929) is an American computer scientist and inventor. He was a founding member of the computer division at Hewlett-Packard, where he led the team that created the HP 2116A. He is the Chief Executive Officer of ROD-L electronics and has been involved with the development of electrical safety equipment.

Early life and education 
Clay was born in Kinloch, Missouri. At the time, Kinloch was the oldest African American community that was incorporated in Missouri. During his summer holidays he worked as a gardener in Ferguson, Missouri, but was encouraged by the local police to leave the majority white town. Despite experiencing racism throughout his childhood, Clay's mother told him to "you will face racism the rest of your life, but don't ever let that be a reason why you don't succeed". Clay attended a segregated school and eventually was awarded a scholarship to study mathematics at Saint Louis University (SLU). Whilst at SLU Clay wanted to become a Baseball player. He was one of the first African-Americans to graduate from SLU with a bachelor's degree in 1951 and, after struggling to find work in technology, Clay started work as a school teacher. At an interview for McDonnell Aircraft Corporation, Clay was taken aside and told "Mr. Clay, I'm very sorry, we don't hire professional Negroes". He taught himself to code, and by 1958 was a programmer at Lawrence Livermore National Laboratory. His early work involved creating a radiation tracking system to study the aftermath of a nuclear explosion. Whilst working at Lawrence Livermore National Laboratory Clay was introduced to David Packard, who encouraged Clay to apply for a job. After leaving LLNL Clay worked at Control Data Corporation, where he created new Fortran compilers.

Career 
In 1962 Clay moved to Palo Alto, California. Clay joined Hewlett-Packard (HP), where he helped to launch and lead the Computer Science division in 1965. He was director of the team who developed the HP 2116A, one of Hewlett-Packard's first mini-computers. Clay stayed at HP until the mid seventies, eventually rising to being the highest-ranking African-American member of staff. Whilst working at HP Clay developed several initiatives to improve the representation of African-Americans in Silicon Valley. He recognised the need to test electrical products for safety, and left HP in 1971 to start his own business.

Clay is the founding director of ROD-L Electronics, which is based in Menlo Park, California. The company is recognised not only for its technical innovation but its community work. Clay invented the dielectric withstand test, or high potential (hipot) safety test. In 2002 Clay was elected by the African American Museum and Library at Oakland as one of the most important African-Americans working in technology. San Mateo County awarded ROD-L Electronics the Dads Count Family Friendly Employer Award and Clay was inducted into the Silicon Valley Hall of Fame in 2003.

Clay was involved with local politics, and was the first African-American to join the city council of Palo Alto. He was elected Vice Mayor in 1976.

Personal life 
Clay was married to Virginia Clay, with whom he had three sons. After his wife died in 1995 Clay founded the Virginia Clay Annual Golf Classic.

References 

African-American engineers
People from St. Louis County, Missouri
Saint Louis University alumni
Computer scientists
Computer engineers
1929 births
Living people
21st-century African-American people
20th-century African-American people